Following are the results of the 2008 UEMOA Tournament, the soccer tournament held among member nations of the West African Economic and Monetary Union (UEMOA).  The tournament is also called Coupe de l'intégration ouest africaine.  All games were played in Bamako, Mali, at the Stade Modibo Keita.

Group A

Table

Results

Group B

Table

Results

Final

External links
Official Site - https://web.archive.org/web/20090131052428/http://www.tournoiuemoa.com//

2008 in African football
2008
UEMOA Tournament, 2008
2008 in Ivorian football
2008 in Malian sport
November 2008 sports events in Africa